The 2021 season was Sunrisers' second season, in which they competed in the 50 over Rachael Heyhoe Flint Trophy and the new Twenty20 competition, the Charlotte Edwards Cup. The side finished bottom of the Rachael Heyhoe Flint Trophy group stage, losing all seven of their matches. The side recorded their first ever win in their opening match of the Charlotte Edwards Cup, beating Western Storm, but did not win any further matches, finishing bottom of Group B.
 
The side was captained by Amara Carr in the Rachael Heyhoe Flint Trophy and Kelly Castle in the Charlotte Edwards Cup, and coached by Trevor Griffin. They played three home matches at the County Ground, Chelmsford, two at Fenner's and one apiece at the County Ground, Northampton and Merchant Taylors' School.

Squad
Sunrisers announced their initial 18-player squad on 26 May 2021. Florence Miller was promoted to the senior squad from the Academy on 18 August 2021. Age given is at the start of Sunrisers' first match of the season (29 May 2021).

Rachael Heyhoe Flint Trophy

Season standings

 Advanced to the final
 Advanced to the play-off

Fixtures

Tournament statistics

Batting

Source: ESPN Cricinfo Qualification: 100 runs.

Bowling

Source: ESPN Cricinfo Qualification: 5 wickets.

Charlotte Edwards Cup

Group B

 Advanced to the semi-final

Fixtures

Tournament statistics

Batting

Source: ESPN Cricinfo Qualification: 50 runs.

Bowling

Source: ESPN Cricinfo Qualification: 5 wickets.

Season statistics

Batting

Bowling

Fielding

Wicket-keeping

References

Sunrisers (women's cricket) seasons
2021 in English women's cricket